Myrsini Malakou is a Greek biologist. She was awarded the Goldman Environmental Prize in 2001, for her contributions to the protection of the wetlands of Préspa, jointly with fellow biologist Giorgos Catsadorakis.

References 

Year of birth missing (living people)
Living people
Greek biologists
Greek environmentalists
Goldman Environmental Prize awardees